Award Software International Inc. was a BIOS manufacturer founded in 1983,  by Rene Vishney and Bob Stillman in San Jose, California. In 1984 the company moved its international headquarters to Los Gatos, California, United States.

History
In 1988, Bob Stillmen left the company. The company was privately held by Rene Vishney (Chairman of the Board) and his wife Deborah Lee (Marlow) Vishney (Chief Executive Officer).

In 1993, it was sold to Taiwan company GCH Systems Ltd. (now defunct).

On 24 October 1996, Award Software International Inc. announced its initial public offering.

On 16 June 1997, Award Software International Inc. announced the acquisition of BIOS upgrades provider Unicore Software, Inc. making it a subsidiary of Award.

On 16 April 1998, Phoenix Technologies Ltd. and Award Software International Inc. announced the completion of a definitive merger agreement, where Phoenix Technologies Ltd. would become the surviving corporate entity following the merger completion on 30 June 1998. The merger was completed on 28 September 1998.

After merger
After the Phoenix–Award merger, later revisions of Award BIOS still attribute copyright to Award Software Inc instead of Phoenix Technologies Ltd., including the UEFI firmware.

Subsidiaries
Award Software Europe
Award Software Hong Kong, Ltd
Award Software Japan, KK: Established in 1997-06-03.
Award Software International, Inc.
Unicore Software, Inc.

Products

AwardBIOS: It is a BIOS developed by Award Software, and later Phoenix Technologies.
CardWare: It is a PC Card software product.
EliteBIOS: It is the system management software product that Award Software designs, develops and markets to the manufacturers of desktop, server, mobile and embedded systems.
PC DIAG: Diagnostic software
CheckIt POSTcard: Power On Self Test system diagnostic board
ISA POSTcard: ISA Diagnostic hardware
PCI POSTcard: PCI Diagnostic hardware
Preboot Manager
SMSAccess: System management software suite
DMIAccess: Desktop Management Interface utilities
LMAccess: Microsoft Windows NT and Windows 95-based hardware status monitoring and alarm application
MPCAccess
RPBAccess: Remote, preboot diagnostic and repair software
USBAccess: It is a USB-host software targeted for consumer electronics and embedded device manufacturers.
WWWAccess: Product suite for Internet appliance applications using Intel x86 embedded design.
APIAccess: Integrates Win32 applications into real-time systems. Formerly Willows Toolkit for UNIX and Willows RT for Embedded Systems from Willows Software.

See also

 BIOS features comparison

References

External links
Award website (archive)
Award Software has merged with Phoenix Technologies (archive)
Unicore Software, Inc. (archive)
Archives of Award Taiwan website (English)
Taiwan Venutures Capital Corp · SC 13G · Award Software International Inc · On 2/14/97
Archives of AwardBIOS motherboard download page

1983 establishments in California
1998 disestablishments in California
1998 mergers and acquisitions
American companies established in 1983
American companies disestablished in 1998
BIOS
Companies based in Mountain View, California
Computer companies established in 1983
Computer companies disestablished in 1998
Defunct companies based in the San Francisco Bay Area
Defunct computer companies based in California
Defunct computer companies of the United States
Defunct software companies of the United States
Software companies based in the San Francisco Bay Area
Software companies established in 1983
Software companies disestablished in 1998